Anomiopus pictus is a species of true dung beetle that can be found in Brazil and Perú. It may be a myrmecophile.

References

pictus
Beetles described in 1862